Waylaying (sometimes called "laywaying") was a term used in the American Old West describing an armed attack whereby the attacker hid himself in ambush and fired upon a passing target. According to late historian C.L. Sonnichsen there were many methods by which frontier feuds were resolved and murder committed;
"Waylaying was not merely tolerated but strongly recommended, and everybody knew that the right way to handle it was to get down behind a bush beside the road, wait till your target for tonight ride past you, and then fire at the place where his suspenders crossed, the steadiest part of the man-horse combination."

References
The Grave of John Wesley Hardin: Three Essays on Grassroots History by C.L. Sonnichsen, Texas A&M University Press,1979 p. 24

American frontier